Tillandsia adpressiflora is a species in the genus Tillandsia. This species is native to Bolivia, Venezuela, Colombia, Ecuador, Peru, French Guiana, and northern Brazil.

References

adpressiflora
Flora of South America
Plants described in 1896